The Viaduc des Arts is a converted train line located in the 12th arrondissement of Paris which is now both a string of workshops for highly skilled artisans and, on the top level, a linear park.  It was, formerly, the “Viaduc de Bastille,” for the trains of the Paris-Bastille-Vincennes line.

This re-purposing project was designed by the architect Patrick Berger under the direction of the SEMAEST, a private-public consortium for infrastructure development.

The vaults of the Viaduc now host the workshops of artisans working in such diverse areas as glass blowing, furniture manufacturing and jewellery making. Thus, the Viaduc preserves the 12th arrondissement’s tradition of skilled craftsmanship.

The Promenade Plantée is a linear park built on top of the Viaduc.

History

In 1853, the private company “Société de Chemin de Fer Paris Strasbourg” was authorised to build a train line crossing Paris 12th arrondissement from Bastille to Verneuil l’Etang, passing through Vincennes. The project required massive construction work, including tunnels and crossings. 

The “Viaduc de la Bastille” — a 1,5 km long viaduct consisting of 64 vaults—  was a major part of the overall project. The brick and stone construction is about 10 meters high.

The train line was opened in 1859. It ceased to operate in 1969 after the creation of the RER A regional transport line, into which a part of the original line was integrated. The Paris-Vincennes stretch was completely abandoned (except for the merchandise train station at Reuilly).

In 1979, the APUR (Atelier Parisien d’Urbanisme) was commissioned to rethink the use of the viaduct that follows the Rue de Lyon and the Avenue Daumesnil  Along with the choice of replacing the Bastille Station with a new Opera house (Opera Bastille), the decision was taken to re-purpose the railroad line itself into a public park, and to make use of the space under the viaduct’s vaults as places for artisans to work and display their wares. Indeed, the viaduc offered an attractive façade onto the Avenue Daumesnil and its vaults provided useful and unusual spaces is their own right.

In 1983, the plan for the public park - the “Promenade Plantée” - linking Place de la Bastille to Bois de Vincennes was one of the most important projects for the revitalization of the eastern neighbourhoods of Paris. The project was designed by the landscape architect Jacques Vergely and the architect Philippe Mathieux.

In 1988, the design of the architect Patrick Berger was chosen for the reconversion of the arcades into a strip of workshops, and the first part of the promenade plantée (from rue Picpus to rue Michel Bizot) was opened one year later. The occupation of the vaults by artisans began in 1994 and was completed in 1997.

The design of the re-purposing project consisted mainly of cleaning the viaduct and closing the vaults with glass walls on their two sides. The central parts of the arches were cleared out in order to add relief in the façade and to allow the shadow of each arch to highlight its curved shape. These changes allowed the 64 vaults (whose sizes vary between 150 and 460 m²) to be converted into a strip of workshops and cafés.

Gallery

Workshops along the Viaduc des Arts
 Atelier Le Tallec - Handmade porcelain decoration (1995-2015)
 Atelier Maurice Dupont - Music instruments and accessories
 Silka Design Tzuri Gueta - Textile and silicon jewelry 
 Ateliers du Temps Passé - Paintings and restoration of art objects  
 Aurélie Cherell - Women's fashion and wedding dresses 
 Créations Cherif - Contemporary design furniture
 Atelier Michel Fey - Leather work 
 Le Bonheur des Dames - Embroidery work 
 Tissus Malhia Kent - Textile making for Haute-Couture 
 Aisthesis - Art cabinet making 
 Atelier Guigue Locca - Restoration and creation of furniture 
 Roger Lanne Luthier - Restoration and creation of violins and cellos 
 Parasolerie Heurtault - Umbrellas and parasol making

Cafés and restaurants
 Viaduc Café 
 Restaurant l'Arrosoir

References

External links 

Le Viaduc des Arts Official website
Patrick Berger Official page
SEMAEST Official page
Paris Tourism Office on Promenade Plantée
Mairie de Paris 12 Official page
Ateliers de Paris Official page

Railway bridges in France
Buildings and structures in the 12th arrondissement of Paris
Former railway bridges
Viaducts in France
Cultural venues in Paris